Mādhava means Krishna. It may also refer to:
a Sanskrit patronymic, "descendant of Madhu (a man of the Yadu tribe)".
 especially of Krishna, see Madhava (Vishnu)
 an icon of Krishna
 Madhava of Sangamagrama, fourteenth-century Indian mathematician  
 Madhvacharya, philosopher in the Vaishnavism tradition
 Madhava Vidyaranya, Advaita saint and brother of Sayana
 Venkata Madhava, 10th to 12th century commentator of the Rigveda
 Madhavdeva, 16th-century proponent of Ekasarana dharma, neo-Vaishnavism of Assam
relating to springtime; the first month of spring, see Chaitra
a name of Krishna
Madhava or Madhava-kara, an Indian physician of the 7th or early 8th century
Madhava, titular protagonist of the ancient Indian drama Mālatīmādhava by Bhavabhuti

See also
Madhavan (disambiguation)
Madhavi (disambiguation)
Magha (month) (ruled by Madhava)